The 7th Infantry Division, also known as the Golden Arrow (after its formation sign) and Peshawar Division, (after its garrison city) is one of the Pakistan Army's oldest and most battle-hardened division. The officers and men of the Golden Arrow Division have fought in all of Pakistan's Wars and have an unmatched combat service record.

Second World War origins
The division was raised on 1 October 1940 at Okara, in present-day Pakistan as the 7th Indian Infantry Division, part of the British Indian Army. Its formation sign was an arrow, pointing bottom left to top right, in yellow on a black background. The division was known as the "Golden Arrow" division from this sign.

After initially training for operations in the deserts in the Middle East, in early 1943 it was reassigned to the Burma Campaign. After extensive training and preparation, it fought in the Arakan from December 1943. After the divisional HQ was overrun by a Japanese attack, units of the division took part in the Battle of the Admin Box. The division later moved to Assam and fought in the Battle of Kohima. In 1945 it played a prominent part in the Battle of Central Burma and the subsequent advance down the Irrawaddy River.

After the war ended, the division moved to Thailand, where it disarmed the Japanese occupying army, and liberated and repatriated Allied prisoners of war.

From 1947 with Pakistan
After the independence of Pakistan in 1947, the division under the command of Major General Frederick Loftus-Tottenham, was one of two allocated to the new Pakistan army.

The 7th Infantry Division is currently being commanded by Major General Shakir, AC.

The Division first saw action during the Indo-Pakistan War of 1948, where it fought and captured some territory in the Poonch sector.

In the intervening years, the formation became part of the Pakistan Army's strategic reserve. At the outbreak of the Indo-Pakistani War of 1965, the Peshawar Division was commanded by a native Peshawarite; Major General Yahya Khan. In it, the Golden Arrow's were the lead division of the Operation Grand Slam, where they and two divisions which had been placed under the division's command managed to achieve the most dramatic breakthrough of the war when they defeated the Indian formations in front of them, capturing the district of Chamb, and pushed up to a position 6 km beyond Jammu City, by the end of hostilities. Its commander, General Yahya Khan would be awarded the Hilal-e-Jurat for this achievement.

During Black September in 1970 the Jordanian Government asked the Pakistan Government to assist in putting down the Palestinian uprising. The Peshawar Division was dispatched to Jordan where it would be placed under the command of the Pakistani attaché; Muhammad Zia ul-Haq (later President of Pakistan, and would restore order and government control in Jordan.

6 years later, during the Indo-Pakistan War of 1971 the Peshawar Division would once again be called into action. Once again Pakistan's strategic reserve, along with 1st Armoured Division, would not see action as a unit but many of its sub-units would enter combat in various sectors.

The formation would go overseas for the third time in its history (and for the second time as a Pakistani division) when it deployed with two brigades to Saudi Arabia for the 1991 Gulf War.

It would be the better part of a decade, before the formation would get the call to arms again, but when it came it was at the highest battlefield of the world, and several units would serve in that area. In 1999 during the Kargil War, the division was sent as a reinforcement to the Gultari area.

After 9/11, and the United States led invasion of Afghanistan, the Golden Arrows would be called into a period of almost continuous action in difficult and mountainous terrain, carrying out operations in Waziristan and the North West Frontier Province (now called: Khyber-Pakhtunkhwa), against Al-Qaeda and Taliban escaping from Afghanistan. Most of the Al-Qaeda operatives have been captured by elements of this formation.

Under its corps headquarters, XI Corps, the Division took part in the 2009 South Waziristan offensive.

Order of battle
It is unsure what the exact composition of the formation is, since the Peshawar Division has received several additional troops during the ongoing war on terror, but the peacetime order of battle is:
 HQ 7th Infantry Division; Peshawar
 6 Infantry Brigade; Khar
 27 Infantry Brigade; Landi Kotal
 102 Infantry Brigade; Peshawar

 Division Troops; under HQ command, but usually parcelled out to the Brigades.

Locations and designations of brigades are not confirmed. Though, the Division Headquarter is based in Miran shah, NWA.

References

External links
 Globalsecurity.org, http://www.globalsecurity.org/military/world/india/7-div.htm
 www.Orbat.com - Contains information on Pakistan Army Divisions including the Golden Arrows
 Pakistan Army; A History, by Brian Cloughly.
 7th Infantry Division Soldiers advance in Kashmir, 1965 war
 GOC of the Division, briefs President of Pakistan on situation. 1965 War

Divisions of the Pakistan Army
Military units and formations established in 1940
Peshawar